Romanovka is a stratovolcano in central Kamchatka. The volcano is located at the north of Kozyrevka River in the southern Sredinny Range.

See also 
 List of volcanoes in Russia

References 

Volcanoes of the Kamchatka Peninsula
Mountains of the Kamchatka Peninsula
Stratovolcanoes of Russia
Pleistocene stratovolcanoes
Pleistocene Asia